Alexander Maconochie (11 February 1787 – 25 October 1860) was a Scottish naval officer, geographer, and penal reformer.

In 1840, Maconochie became the Governor of Norfolk Island, a prison island where convicts were treated with severe brutality and were seen as lost causes. Upon reaching the island, Maconochie immediately instituted policies that restored dignity to prisoners, achieving remarkable success in prisoner rehabilitation. These policies were well in advance of their time and Maconochie was politically undermined. His ideas would be largely ignored and forgotten, only to be readopted as the basis of modern penal systems over a century later in the mid- to late 20th century.

Early life, naval career and geographer
Maconochie was born in Edinburgh on 11 February 1787. At the age of 9, his father died and he was raised by Allan Maconochie, later Lord Meadowbank.

He joined the Royal Navy in 1803 and as a midshipman saw active service in the Napoleonic Wars, rising to the rank of Lieutenant. In 1811 he was serving on the Brig HMS Grasshopper, which shipwrecked Christmas Eve off the coast of the Dutch Coast. He, together with all those on board, were taken as a prisoner of war and extradited to the French. The forced march in the winter-bitter-cold of Holland to Verdun and more than two years of miserable imprisonment gave him an experience that he used later in his penal reform. He was released upon Napoleon's abdication in 1814.  He returned to active service in the British-American War where he commanded HMS Calliope.  In 1815, he was promoted to the rank of Commander.

In the peace following the final defeat of Napoleon, Maconochie spent 13 years in Edinburgh studying geography and geopolitics. At this time he wrote extensively on steam navigation and the colonisation of the Pacific. He married in 1822. In 1828 he moved to London, England where he was a founder and first secretary of the Royal Geographical Society in 1830. In 1833 he became the first professor of Geography at the University College London, and was a knight of the Royal Guelphic Order.

Penal reformer 

In 1836 he sailed to the convict settlement at Hobart in Van Diemen's Land (now Tasmania) as private secretary to the Lieutenant-Governor Sir John Franklin.  Here he wrote a report strongly critical of the state of prison discipline.  The convict system, being fixated on punishment alone, released back into society crushed, resentful and bitter expirees, in whom the spark of enterprise and hope was dead.  Maconochie's report "can be said to mark the peak and incipient decline of transportation to Australia" when it was given to Lord Russell, the Home Secretary and ardent critic of transportation, claims Robert Hughes. Although this report was used by the Molesworth Committee on transportation in 1837–38, the criticism of this work forced Franklin to dismiss him.

According to his biographer John Barry, Maconochie "was a deeply religious man, of generous and compassionate temperament, and convinced of the dignity of man".  His two basic principles of penology were that:
 as cruelty debases both the victim and society, punishment should not be vindictive but should aim at the reform of the convict to observe social constraints, and
 a convict's imprisonment should consist of task, not time sentences, with release depending on the performance of a measurable amount of labour.

Following the Molesworth committee's report, transportation to New South Wales was abolished in 1840, although it continued to other colonies.  Disturbed at reports of conditions on Norfolk Island, Lord Normanby, Secretary of State for the Colonies, suggested that a new system should be used, and the superintendence given to an officer deeply concerned with the moral welfare of the convicts.  Maconochie was recommended to put this new system in place.

In March 1840 he took up duties as commandant of the penal settlement at Norfolk Island and applied his penal principles.  Convicts were awarded 'marks' to encourage effort and thrift.  Sentences were served in stages, each increasing in responsibility.  Cruel punishments and degrading conditions were reduced, and convicts' sense of dignity was respected.  Perhaps the fact that he had experienced the life of a prisoner himself played a part in his approach to his task. He was the only commandant with such an experience.

These views contrasted greatly with the cruel conditions that had existed on Norfolk Island prior to Maconochie's arrival.  He was not permitted to apply his principles to the 1,200 hardened twice-sentenced convicts, but only to the 600 newcomers sent directly from the United Kingdom and who were separated from the 'Old Hands'.  His 'mark' system was not permitted to reduce a convict's sentence, and it was difficult to find other incentives.  His reforms were resisted by military guards, supervisors and constables (many of whom were ex-convicts) under his command.  In particular, his deputy held views opposite to his own.  In an exclusively male environment, he found he was unable to reduce the 'unnatural offence' of sodomy which was prevalent and which he continued to punish by flogging. Criticism of his methods in Sydney and England led Governor Sir George Gipps to visit the island in 1843.  He was favourably impressed with the condition of the convicts and the effectiveness of the 'marks' system, and reported that Maconochie's System of Moral Reform could work if carried through to its conclusion.  However the order had already been given in the United Kingdom for Maconochie to be replaced. Under the commandants who followed him, Norfolk Island reverted to being an object of terror under brutal masters.

Almost 1,400 convicts had been discharged during Maconochie's term, and he always claimed that a high percentage did not offend again. He is known as the "Father of Parole".

Later life

Maconochie returned to the UK in 1844 and two years later published a book outlining his system. This had an immense influence on the development of penology. In 1849 he was appointed governor of the new prison at Birmingham, but was dismissed and criticised for his actions, in spite of being praised for his humanity and benevolence.

He died on 25 October 1860 at Morden in Surrey, still campaigning for penal reform in spite of ill-health. He was buried at St Lawrence Church, London Road, Morden, Surrey. His grave can still be seen in the Churchyard.

Legacy
John Barry states that "Maconochie was a pioneer in penal reform, and suffered the fate of men in advance of their times.  His concepts and many of his practical measures are now the basis of Western penal systems".

The Alexander Maconochie Centre, a prison in Canberra, is named in his honour.

Sir Walter Frederick Crofton (1815–1897) introduced a variant of the 'progressive stages' system of penal discipline into the Irish convict prisons.

Published works

References

Primary Sources
 Parliamentary Papers (1846, Volume VII, House of Lords), Correspondence re Convict Discipline, consisting of Part I, Secondary Punishment; Part II, Convict Discipline; Part III, Convict Discipline and Convict Estimates
 Parliamentary Papers (1846, Volume VII, House of Lords), Correspondence re Convict System administered in Norfolk Island under the superintendence of Captain Maconochie
 Parliamentary Papers (1854, Volume XXXI, House of Commons), Report of the Commissioners appointed to inquire into the Condition and Treatment of the Prisoners confined in Birmingham Borough Prison, and the Conduct, Management and Discipline of the said Prison

Secondary Sources
 Barry, John V., Alexander Maconochie of Norfolk Island, Melbourne, Oxford University Press, 1958.
 Clay, John, Maconochie’s Experiment (London, 2001)
 Gascoigne, John, The Enlightenment and the Origins of European Australia (Cambridge, 2002)
 
 Hazzard, Margaret, Punishment Short of Death: a history of the penal settlement at Norfolk Island, Melbourne, Hyland, 1984.
 Hughes, Robert, The Fatal Shore, London, Pan, 1988.
 McCulloch, S. C., 'Sir George Gipps and Captain Alexander Maconochie: The Attempted Penal Reforms at Norfolk Island, 1840 – 44,’ Historical Studies Australia and New Zealand, Volume 7, pp387–406
 Morris, Norval, Maconochie’s Gentlemen: The Story of Norfolk Island and the Roots of Modern Prison Reform (New York, 2002)
 ——— and Rothman, David J., (Editors), The Oxford History of the Prison: the Practice of Punishment in Western Society (Oxford, 1998)
 Sturma, Michael, Vice in a Vicious Society: Crime and Convicts in Mid Nineteenth-Century New South Wales (Brisbane, 1983)
 Warung, Price, (Edited by B. G. Andrews), Tales of the Convict System (Hong Kong, 1975)
 ———, Tales of the Early Days, Accessed 31 March 2004
 ———, Tales of the Old Regime (Melbourne, 1897)
 ———, Tales of the Isle of Death (Melbourne, 1898)

1787 births
1860 deaths
Writers from Edinburgh
Penologists
Royal Navy officers
Scottish geographers
Scottish scholars and academics
Scottish reformers
Military personnel from Edinburgh